Celebrating America is a television special which aired as part of the post-inaugural events following the inauguration of Joe Biden on January 20, 2021. Hosted by actor Tom Hanks and produced by Ricky Kirshner, Glenn Weiss, and Stephanie Cutter, the special featured musical performances and speeches from various Americans, including those from President Joe Biden and Vice President Kamala Harris.

The show was nominated in two Primetime Emmy Awards for Outstanding Variety Special (Live) and Outstanding Music Direction.

Description

Traditional inaugural balls, which often gather hundreds of dignitaries to see the president and extend late into the evening, were not held due to restrictions related to the COVID-19 pandemic. A primetime television special, Celebrating America, aired as a substitute in simulcast across most major television networks and other cable and streaming outlets. Hosted by Tom Hanks, the evening event opened with a performance of "Land of Hope and Dreams" by Bruce Springsteen on the steps of the Lincoln Memorial. Hanks then addressed viewers, emphasizing the "promise of our promised land", and introduced four guests, Kareem Abdul-Jabbar, Dolores Huerta, Brayden Harrington, and Kim Ng who, respectively, recited lines from the inaugural addresses of presidents Abraham Lincoln, Franklin D. Roosevelt, John F. Kennedy, and Ronald Reagan, reflecting on their speeches' emphasis of national unity, confidence, patriotism, and peace.

Anthony Gaskin, a Virginia UPS deliveryman, introduced Jon Bon Jovi, who performed an acoustic rendition of "Here Comes the Sun" by The Beatles. Yo-Yo Ma performed a cello solo sampling "Amazing Grace", "Goin' Home" from Dvořák's 9th symphony, and "Simple Gifts". Biden was then introduced by Hanks to the U.S. Navy Band Brass Ensemble's playing of four ruffles and flourishes and "Hail to the Chief"; he spoke inside the Lincoln Memorial and emphasized the importance of "opportunity, liberty, dignity, and respect". Ant Clemons and Justin Timberlake then performed their song "Better Days" in Memphis, Tennessee. Mackenzie Adams, a Washington elementary school teacher, then introduced Foo Fighters; frontman Dave Grohl opened the performance by acknowledging the "creative ways" educators have dealt with teaching modality challenges during the COVID-19 pandemic, and then the band performed "Times Like These".  A cavalcade of Broadway stars performed "Seasons of Love" and "Let the Sunshine In".

Chef and philanthropist José Andrés discussed the food insecurity crisis in America, and introduced Morgan Marsh-McGlone, a Wisconsin elementary school student who raised over US$52,000 for the hungry by creating an online lemonade stand. Lin-Manuel Miranda then recited Irish poet Seamus Heaney's "The Cure at Troy", with Biden joining him to in unison recital of the final line, "And hope and history rhyme".  It is a poem one often quoted by Biden, such as in his address at the 2020 Democratic National Convention.   American members of the Expedition 64 mission on the International Space Station then greeted viewers from orbit. Sarah Fuller, the first woman to play in a football game for a Power Five conference team, introduced Vice President Harris to four ruffles and flourishes and "Hail, Columbia"; she characterized the American people as "bold, fearless, and ambitious", exemplifying the Apollo 11 moon landing and civil rights and women's suffragette movements. John Legend then performed his rendition of "Feeling Good".

Sandra Lindsay, a nurse who is the first U.S. citizen to receive a COVID-19 vaccine, introduced Tyler Hubbard and Tim McGraw, who performed their collaborative song "Undivided" on a Nashville rooftop. Former presidents Clinton, Bush, and Obama, appearing in the Arlington Memorial Amphitheater, remarked on the importance of uniting America and witnessing the peaceful transfer of power; they also offered words of support for Biden and Harris. Demi Lovato then celebrated frontline healthcare workers in their performance of Bill Withers's song "Lovely Day". In closing the special, Katy Perry performed her song "Firework" during a fireworks show over the Washington Monument, with views of Biden, Harris, and their spouses watching from the White House and Lincoln Memorial.

Appearances

Speakers

Performances

Production and broadcast
Celebrating America was produced by Ricky Kirshner, Glenn Weiss, and Stephanie Cutter the same team that produced the 2020 Democratic National Convention. It was broadcast on all major television networks, including ABC, CBS, NBC and PBS, as well as cable networks such as BET, CNN and MSNBC. It was also livestreamed online through the Presidential Inaugural Committee's YouTube, Facebook, Twitter and Twitch accounts. Streaming partners for the event include Amazon Prime Video, Microsoft Bing, NewsNow from Fox, DirecTV and AT&T U-verse.

The fireworks display for the program's finales was created by Strictly FX.

Reception

Critical response
The event was acclaimed by critics, with Caroline Framke of Variety writing that Celebrating America "perfectly encapsulates President Joe Biden". Lily Janiak of the San Francisco Chronicle described the special as "meh TV but fantastic civics" and that it could "help us make ordinariness and kindness normal again." Dominic Patten and Ted Johnson of Deadline Hollywood wrote that Celebrating America proved a "solemn & successful affair" and that it was "a PSA for the USA, and maybe the calming medicine of a message that we and the world needed to hear." Writing for The Independent, Mark Beaumont said that the special made Biden's inauguration "a safe, soothing tribute to anti-fascism."

While he described the special's content as "more the entertainment-politics equivalent of a chain restaurant with a big menu" where "it wasn’t going to be anyone’s favorite, but everyone could find something on the menu for them", chief television critic of The New York Times James Poniewozik wrote that it "promised that daylight is coming" and that "the long, cold, lonely winter would end, and the sun would come."

Viewership
More than 21 million people watched the television special, with CNN's broadcast being watched by over 6 million people, as part of its overall coverage of the inauguration ceremony. NBC's broadcast of the special was the most watched among the broadcast networks, followed by ABC and CBS. The three networks' telecast of the event competed with Fox's The Masked Dancer and Name That Tune and The CW's Riverdale and Nancy Drew.

 Broadcast network

 Cable network

Awards and nominations

References

External links
 

2021 in Washington, D.C.
Articles containing video clips
2021 in American television
2021 television specials
Inauguration of Joe Biden
January 2021 events in the United States
Presidency of Joe Biden
Simulcasts